Monongalia County Schools is a school district headquartered in Morgantown, West Virginia. It serves all of Monongalia County.

Schools
Middle/high schools:
 Clay/Battelle Middle-High School

High schools:
 Morgantown High School
 University High School

Middle schools:
 Mountaineer Middle School (Formerly Cheat Lake Middle School)
 South Middle School
 Suncrest Middle School
 Westwood Middle School

Elementary schools:
 Brookhaven Elementary School
 Cheat Lake Elementary School
 Eastwood Elementary School
 Mason Dixon Elementary School
 Mountainview Elementary School
 Mylan Park Elementary School
 North Elementary School
 Ridgedale Elementary School
 Skyview Elementary School
 Suncrest Primary School

Other:
 Monongalia County Technical Education Center

References

External links
 Monongalia County Schools
Education in Monongalia County, West Virginia
School districts in West Virginia